Mieke de Boer (born 11 January 1980 in Maastricht, Limburg) is a former darts player from the Netherlands, who was nicknamed Bambie.

Career

In 2002 she won the Women's World Darts Trophy, beating Karin Krappen in the quarter finals and then Francis Hoenselaar in the semi finals before beating Crissy Manley in the final. She also won the British Open Ladies Singles the same year. A year later, de Boer was the youngest competitor at the BDO World Darts Championship in Frimley Green and reached the semi finals, beating Linda Rogers-Pickett in the quarter finals before her run was ended by Ladies World Champion Trina Gulliver. She returned to the Lakeside a year later but lost in the quarter finals to Hoenselaar. Her last major tournament was the 2005 World Darts Trophy, losing in the quarter finals to Karin Krappen. Since then, de Boer has not been successful in qualifying for any of the major tournaments. When not playing, de Boer also works as an analyst for Dutch television.

World Championship results

BDO

 2003: Semi Finals (lost to Trina Gulliver 0–2)
 2004: Quarter Finals (lost to Francis Hoenselaar 0–2)

External links
 Personal website
 Profile and Stats on Darts Database

1980 births
Dutch darts players
Living people
Sportspeople from Maastricht
Female darts players
British Darts Organisation players